The  de Havilland DH.95 Flamingo was a British twin-engined high-wing monoplane airliner first flown on 22 December 1938.  During the Second World War some were used by the Royal Air Force (RAF) as a transport and general communications duties.

Design and development
The Flamingo was a twin-engined civil airliner developed by de Havilland, led by their newly appointed chief designer R. E. Bishop, and was the first all-metal stressed-skin aircraft built by the company; only the control surfaces were fabric covered. It was  powered by two 890 hp Bristol Perseus air-cooled radial engines driving three-bladed de Havilland Propellers 'Hydromatic' variable-pitch propellers.  Two pilots were seated side by side with a radio operator behind them in the cockpit, with the cabin accommodating 12–17 passengers. It had a retractable undercarriage, slotted flaps, and was considered a highly promising sales prospect for the  company, capable of competing with the American Douglas DC-3 and Lockheed Model 10 Electra. The  first prototype flew on 22 December 1938.

Powered by 890 hp (660 kW) Bristol Perseus XIIIC engines, it had a maximum weight takeoff in 750 ft (230 m) and the ability to maintain height or climb at 120 mph (190 km/h) on a single engine. Testing was successful, with the Flamingo being granted a certificate of airworthiness on 30 June 1939, with an initial production run of twenty aircraft being laid down.

A single military transport variant was built to Specification 19/39 as the DH.95 Hertfordshire. It had oval cabin windows instead of rectangular ones, and seating for 22 soldiers. A proposed order for 40 was cancelled to leave de Havilland free to produce Tiger Moth trainers. The sole Hertfordshire crashed on 23 October 1940 killing five crew and six passengers, including Air Vice-marshal Charles Blount, the AOC of No. 22 Group travelling from Hendon to Northern Ireland, apparently due to jamming of the elevator.

Operational service

Following the success of the first test flights Jersey Airways ordered three 17-seat aircraft, and this was followed by orders from the Egyptian government and the Air Ministry. The Air Ministry aircraft were to be used by the Air Council and the King's Flight.

The prototype, fitted with 12 passenger seats, was delivered to Jersey Airways in May 1939 for two months evaluation and became the first revenue-earning Flamingo. The first services carried mail only but in July a regular weekend passenger service was operated.

In October 1939 the prototype was bought by the Air Council, being delivered to No. 24 Squadron RAF where it operated until it was lost in an accident in October 1940. The second aircraft was to be the first for Guernsey and Jersey Airlines but it was impressed into military service and delivered to 24 Squadron, the other two on order were never built due to the outbreak of the Second World War.

The King's Flight aircraft was to be used in the event of the royal family having to leave the country but in the end it was passed to 24 Squadron for communications and liaison duties.

Early in 1940 BOAC ordered eight aircraft to be powered by the Perseus XVI and originally intended as ten-seaters. The first BOAC aircraft was delivered to Whitchurch on 5 September 1940. The second BOAC aircraft was impressed by the Air Ministry and allocated for Admiralty use at RNAS Donibristle. To replace the impressed aircraft BOAC were later allotted the aircraft ordered by the Egyptian Government. After a period of training all the BOAC Flamingos were moved to Cairo to operate in the Middle East. The BOAC aircraft were named after English Kings and were named K-class by the airline.

The Flamingo was Winston Churchill's favorite short/medium range transport and he flew it to visit Reynaud and the French leadership as the front collapsed on May 16, 1940.

The BOAC Flamingoes were not popular, and following three accidents – one of which was fatal – and with a lack of spares, the airline decided to withdraw the type. In 1943 the five airworthy aircraft were shipped back to the United Kingdom. They did not return to service and were scrapped in the early 1950s.

Most of the RAF aircraft were withdrawn from use during the war and were slowly scrapped to provide spares for the remaining aircraft. The Admiralty aircraft was due to be withdrawn and scrapped but in August 1944 it ground looped at Gatwick and was abandoned. In 1946 the former Admiralty aircraft was bought by Southern Aircraft (Gatwick) and rebuilt using former BOAC spare parts. It flew again in 1947 and was delivered to British Air Transport at Redhill, gaining a Certificate of Airworthiness. It operated a number of charter flight until it was temporarily withdrawn from use in 1949.

British Air Transport also arranged to restore three former BOAC aircraft, the scheme was abandoned although the aircraft were in an advanced stage of reconstruction. In 1952, British Air Transport restored the original former Admiralty aircraft which flew again on 27 May 1952. Redhill Aerodrome was closed in 1954 and the last flying Flamingo was dismantled and scrapped.

Operators

Military operators

Royal Air Force
No. 24 Squadron RAF
King's Flight
Fleet Air Arm
782 Naval Air Squadron

Civilian operators

BOAC
British Air Transport
Jersey Airways

Specifications (de Havilland Flamingo)

See also

References

Sources
 Bain, Gordon. De Havilland: A Pictorial Tribute. London: AirLife, 1992. .
 Green, William and Gordon Swanborough. "De Havilland's War Orphan." Air Enthusiast. Number 30, March–June 1986, pp. 1–10. Bromley, Kent, UK: Pilot Press.
 Jackson, A.J. De Havilland Aircraft since 1909. London: Putnam, Third edition 1987. .
The Birth of an Airliner , Picture Post , 15 July 1939 pages 43–48

1930s British airliners
1930s British military transport aircraft
Flamingo
World War II British transport aircraft
Aircraft first flown in 1938